is a prize-winning Japanese novelist.

Early life
Tsujihara was born in 1945.

Prizes and honours
 1990 Akutagawa Prize for Mura no namae (村の名前, A Village's Name)
 1999 Yomiuri Prize for Tobe kirin (Fly, Kirin!)
 2000 Tanizaki Prize for Yudotei Enboku (遊動亭円木)
 2005 Kawabata Yasunari Prize for Kareha no naka no aoi honoo (枯葉の中の青い炎, Blue Flames Among the Dry Leaves)
 2012 Medal with Purple Ribbon
 2022 Person of Cultural Merit

Selected works 
 Manon no nikutai (マノンの肉体), Tōkyō : Bungei Shunjū, 1990.
 Mura no namae (村の名前), Tōkyō : Bungei Shunjū, 1990. .
 Yuri no kokoro (百合の心), Tōkyō : Kōdansha, 1990.
 Shinrinsho (森林書), Tōkyō : Bungei Shunjū, 1994. .
 Kazoku shashin : tanpenshū (家族 写真 : 短編集), Tōkyō : Bungei Shunjū, 1995. .
 Dare no mono demo nai kanashimi (だれのものでもない悲しみ), Tōkyō : Chūō Kōronsha, 1995.
 Sōgyōsha wa nanadaime : Jasuko kaichō, Okada Takuya no ikikata (創業者は七代目 : ジャスコ会長, 岡田卓也の生き方), Tōkyō : Mainichi Shinbunsha, 1995.
 Yūdō Teienboku (遊動亭円木), Bungei Shunjū, 1999.
 Hatsunetsu (初熱), Tōkyō : Nihon Keizai Shinbunsha, 2001.
 Yakusoku yo (約束よ), Tōkyō : Shinchōsha, 2002.
 Jasumin (ジャスミン), Tōkyō : Bungei Shunjū, 2004.
 Yūdōtei Enboku (遊動亭円木), Tōkyō : Bungei Shunjū, 2004.
 Kareha no naka no aoi honoo (枯葉の中の青い炎), Tōkyō : Shinchōsha, 2005.

References

External links
 J'Lit | Authors : Noboru Tsujihara | Books from Japan

20th-century Japanese novelists
Akutagawa Prize winners
Yomiuri Prize winners
Living people
Year of birth missing (living people)
Persons of Cultural Merit
Recipients of the Medal with Purple Ribbon